Santa Ana is one of the 28 barangays of Taguig, Metro Manila, Philippines. It is located in the north eastern part of the city and is bounded by the barangays of Calzada and Palingon on the north, the Bambang and Wawa on the south and the barangays of Tuktukan and Ususan on the west, and Laguna de Bay on the southeast. It was the old municipal center of Taguig from its establishment in 1587 during the Spanish colonization of the Philippines. Saint Anne is the patroness of the barangay.

Landmarks
The Archdiocesan Shrine of St. Anne is a Roman Catholic church located in the barangay. Built in 1587, it is situated next to the Taguig River and across Plaza Quezon, where the statue of Manuel L. Quezon was erected when he was still serving as the nation's President. The Taguig Integrated School is also located in the barangay. Its Gabaldon Building, which has remained standing since it was constructed from 1917 to 1928 and currently serves as the school's museum.

References 

Taguig
Barangays of Metro Manila